Mokjong of Goryeo (5 July 980 – 2 March 1009) (r. 997–1009) was the seventh ruler of the Goryeo dynasty of Korea.

Reign 
Born as Wang Song, Mokjong was the only son of King Gyeongjong; however, when his father died, he was too young to become king, so it was his uncle, prince Gaeryeong Wang Chi, who succeeded to the throne as King Seongjong. Mokjong eventually became king after his uncle's death in 997 and chose his mother, Queen Honae, as regent.

Mokjong is known for his reform of the Jeonsigwa (land-allotment system), and for a plot by his mother, Queen Honae and Kim Chi-yang to overthrow him. In the course of the turbulent events surrounding the plot, Mokjong was dethroned by general Gang Jo and sent into exile in Chungju. However, he was slain before he arrived there.

Mokjong's tomb was known as Gongneung, but its present location is not known.

Family 
Father: Gyeongjong of Goryeo (고려경종, 9 November 955 – 13 August 981)
Paternal Grandfather: Gwangjong of Goryeo (고려 광종, 925 – 4 July 975)
Paternal Grandmother: Queen Daemok of the Hwangju Hwangbo clan (대목왕후 황보씨)
Mother: Queen Heonae of the Hwangju Hwangbo clan
Maternal Grandfather: Daejong of Goryeo (고려 대종, d. 969)
Maternal Grandmother: Queen Seonui of the Jeongju Ryu clan (선의왕후 류씨)
Consorts and their Respective Issue(s):
Queen Seonjeong of the Chungju Yu clan (선정왕후 유씨), her maternal first cousin or paternal second cousin - No issue
Palace Lady Yoseoktaek, of the Gim clan  (요석택궁인 김씨) - No issue

In popular culture
 Portrayed by Lee In in the 2009 KBS2 TV series Empress Cheonchu.

See also
List of Korean monarchs
List of Goryeo people
Gang Jo

References

 

980 births
1009 deaths
11th-century Korean monarchs
10th-century Korean monarchs
11th-century murdered monarchs
Assassinated people
Bisexual politicians
Korean LGBT people
Medieval LGBT people
LGBT royalty
People from Kaesong